The 2012 USC Trojans football team represented the University of Southern California in the 2012 NCAA Division I FBS college football season. The Trojans were led by third-year head coach Lane Kiffin, played their home games at Los Angeles Memorial Coliseum, and were members of the South Division of the Pac-12 Conference. USC returned 18 starters and 13 All-Conference performers from a team that finished the 2011 season ranked No. 6 in the AP Poll with a 10–2 record overall, and finished first in the South Division with a 7–2 record in Pac-12 play.  However, as part of a two-year-post-season ban mandated by the NCAA, the Trojans could not claim the 2011 Pac-12 South Division title, participate in the conference championship game or play in a bowl game. The 2012 season was the first year under Kiffin that the Trojans were eligible for post-season play. They started the season ranked #1 in the AP Poll, but finished unranked—the first team to do so since the 1964 Ole Miss Rebels and the first to do so in the BCS-era. The Trojans finished the season 7–6, 5–4 in Pac-12 play, tied for second in the Pac-12 South Division. They were invited to the Sun Bowl where they were defeated 21–7 by Georgia Tech.

Before the season

On December 22, 2011, All-American quarterback Matt Barkley announced that he would be returning to USC for his senior season to complete some "unfinished business" for the Trojans.

Along with Barkley, who was a leading Heisman candidate, the Trojan offense returns nine starters, including 2011 All-Conference center Khaled Holmes, a thousand-yard rusher from 2011 in senior running back Curtis McNeal, and two thousand-yard receivers in Robert Woods and Marqise Lee.  In addition, former Penn State running back Silas Redd transferred to USC and will be immediately eligible to play during the 2012 season.  The addition of Redd means the USC offense now boasts two thousand-yard rushers, two thousand-year receivers, and a 3,500-yard passer from the 2011 season.

On defense, the Trojans return seven starters and four All-Conference players, including first-team All-Conference performers in safety T. J. McDonald and cornerback Nickell Robey-Coleman, senior defensive end Wes Horton, and the team's co-leading tacklers in sophomore linebackers Hayes Pullard and Dion Bailey, who was named the Pac-12 Freshman Defensive Player of the Year in 2011.

USC returns 18 starters and thirteen All-Conference performers in 2012.  The most significant loss on offense came with the early departure of left offensive tackle Matt Kalil, who was drafted No. 4 overall in the First Round of the NFL Draft by the Minnesota Vikings.  Kalil is expected to be succeeded at left offensive tackle by true sophomore Aundrey Walker.  USC also graduated fullback Rhett Ellison, who was also drafted by the Vikings at No. 128 overall in the Fourth Round.  Redshirt freshman Soma Vainuku is the leading contender to start at the fullback position.  The most significant loss on defense came with the early departure of defensive end Nick Perry, who was drafted No. 28 overall in the First Round by the Green Bay Packers.  Perry is expected to be replaced at Right Defensive End by senior Wes Horton.  The Trojans also graduated defensive tackles DaJohn Harris and Christian Tupou, who are expected to be replaced in the starting lineup by sophomore George Uko and redshirt freshman Antwaun Woods.

On July 30, starting Left Defensive End Devon Kennard underwent surgery for a torn pectoralis major muscle.  Team doctors told him that it would take approximately four months to fully recover from the surgery, which would make him a redshirt candidate and allow him to return to USC for a fifth year in 2013.  Sophomore J.R. Tavai was moved to defensive end from nose tackle in fall camp, and will compete with redshirt freshman Greg Townsend to start at Left Defensive End.

On July 31, former Penn State running back Silas Redd announced his intent to transfer to USC in the wake of the NCAA sanctions given to the Nittany Lions relating to the Penn State child sex abuse scandal.  Redd will be immediately eligible to play at USC during the 2012 season due to those sanctions.  On August 5, Redd officially enrolled at USC.

On August 24, starting cornerback Isiah Wiley was declared academically ineligible by the NCAA.  Sophomore Anthony Brown replaced Wiley in the starting lineup.

USC was ranked number one in The Associated Press’ preseason college football poll for the seventh time in school history and the first time in five seasons, edging out No. 2 Alabama and No. 3 LSU.

Personnel

Coaching Staff

Returning starters
USC returns 18 starters in 2012, including nine on offense, seven on defense, and both the starting kicker and punter.  Key departures included offensive tackle Matt Kalil, fullback Rhett Ellison, running back Marc Tyler, defensive end Nick Perry, linebacker Chris Galippo, defensive tackle DaJohn Harris, and nose tackle Christian Tupou.  Before the season, starting cornerback Isiah Wiley was declared academically ineligible, and starting left DE Devon Kennard suffered a pectoral injury that could force him to redshirt this season.

Offense (9)

Defense (7)

Special teams (2)

Roster

Depth chart

Recruiting class

Prior to National Signing Day on February 1, 2012, one junior college player and two high school players that graduated early enrolled for the spring semester in order to participate in spring practice.  These early enrollments included: defensive end Morgan Breslin from Diablo Valley Community College, linebacker Scott Starr from Norco High School, and offensive tackle Chad Wheeler from Santa Monica High School.  Safety/cornerback Joshua Shaw, who started three games at free safety for Florida in 2011, transferred to USC in the spring.

USC's recruiting class was highlighted by six players from the "Rivals 100": No. 16 Zach Banner (OT), No. 18 Nelson Agholor (WR), No. 29 Jordan Simmons (G), No. 40 Jabari Ruffin (LB), No. 46 Max Tuerk (OT), No. 53 Leonard Williams (DE), and No. 82 Kevon Seymour (CB).  Despite being hampered by a 10-scholarship reduction imposed by the NCAA, USC still signed the No. 8 recruiting class according to Rivals.com, the tenth-consecutive year that USC has had a class ranked in the Top 10.

Schedule

Game summaries

Hawaii

USC, ranked No. 1 in the AP Poll, defeated Hawaii, 49–10.  Matt Barkley kicked off his Heisman Trophy campaign with 372 yards passing and four touchdowns. Marqise Lee caught 10 passes for 197 yards, including a 75-yard touchdown on the first play from scrimmage, and returned a kickoff 100 yards for another score.  Robert Woods added two touchdown catches.

1st quarter scoring: USC – Marqise Lee 75 Yd Pass From Matt Barkley (Andre Heidari Kick); USC: Robert Woods 20 Yd Pass From Matt Barkley (Andre Heidari Kick); USC: Hayes Pullard 27 Yd Interception Return (Two-Point Pass Conversion Failed)

2nd quarter scoring: USC: Silas Redd 31 Yd Run (Two-Point Pass Conversion Failed); USC: Robert Woods 2 Yd Pass From Matt Barkley (Two-Point Run Conversion Failed); USC: Andre Heidari 28 Yd FG

3rd quarter scoring: HAW: Scott Harding 18 Yd Pass From Sean Schroeder (Tyler Hadden Kick); USC: Marqise Lee 100 Yd Kickoff Return (Andre Heidari Kick); HAW: Tyler Hadden 36 Yd FG

4th quarter scoring: USC: Randall Telfer 11 Yd Pass From Matt Barkley (Andre Heidari Kick)

Syracuse

The game was played at MetLife Stadium in East Rutherford, New Jersey.  Matt Barkley tied his own school record with six touchdown passes, Marqise Lee caught three touchdown passes, Robert Woods had two, and Xavier Grimble had one.  Dion Bailey had two interceptions on defense.  At halftime, a line of thunderstorms rolled in, and the game was delayed an hour and nine minutes.

1st quarter scoring: None

2nd quarter scoring: USC: Marqise Lee 13 Yd Pass From Matt Barkley (Alex Wood Kick); USC – Robert Woods 29 Yd Pass From Matt Barkley (Alex Wood Kick); SYR – Ross Krautman 37 Yd FG

3rd quarter scoring: USC – Robert Woods 4 Yd Pass From Matt Barkley (Alex Wood Kick); SYR – Marcus Sales 3 Yd Pass From Ryan Nassib (Ross Krautman Kick); SYR – Prince-Tyson Gulley 8 Yd Run (Two-Point Conversion Failed)

4th quarter scoring: USC: Xavier Grimble 22 Yd Pass From Matt Barkley (Alex Wood Kick); USC – Marqise Lee 4 Yd Pass From Matt Barkley (Alex Wood Kick); SYR – Marcus Sales 17 Yd Pass From Ryan Nassib (Two-Point Conversion Failed); USC – Marqise Lee 3 Yd Pass From Matt Barkley (Alex Wood Kick); SYR – Ryan Nassib 1 Yd Run (Ross Krautman Kick)

Stanford

The Cardinal have won four of the last five meetings (the Trojans won the 2008 game), with USC seeking to avenge close losses to the Stanford Cardinal over the last two seasons.  In 2010, Stanford defeated USC, 37–35, on a last-second field goal that was made possible when the clock operator mistakenly stopped running the clock on Stanford's game-winning drive.  In 2011, Stanford defeated USC, 56–48, in triple overtime when USC running back Curtis McNeal fumbled in the red zone.  With the game tied, 34–34, at the end of regulation, USC attempted to call a timeout in order to attempt a game-winning field goal, but time had run out
.

1st quarter scoring: USC – Silas Redd 1-yard run (Alex Wood kick); STAN – Stanfan Taylor 59-yard run (J. Williamson kick)

2nd quarter scoring: USC – Redd 1-yard run (Wood kick)

3rd quarter scoring: STAN – Taylor 23-yard pass from J. Nunes (Williamson kick)

4th quarter scoring: STAN – Z. Ertz 37-yard pass from Nunes (Williamson kick)

Stanford's running back Stepfan Taylor and defensive back Ben Gardner were named Pac-12 Conference Player-of-the-Week following this contest.

California

The Trojans have won the past 8 meetings against the California Golden Bears.  In 2011, the Trojans defeated the Bears, 30–9.

1st quarter scoring: USC – Silas Redd 33-yard run (Andre Heidari kick)

2nd quarter scoring: CAL – Vincen D'Amato 24-yard field goal; USC – Marqise Lee 11-yard pass from Matt Barkley (Heidari kick); USC – Heidari 40-yard field goal

3rd quarter scoring: CAL – D'Amato 26-yard field goal; CAL – D'Amato 35-yard field goal

4th quarter scoring: USC – Heidari 41-yard field goal; USC – Lee 3-yard pass from Barkley (Heidari kick)

Utah

USC won the teams' last meeting in 2011, 23–14.

Washington

In 2011, USC beat Washington by a score of 40–17. USC came out strong in the 1st half with a 24–7 lead at halftime. The Trojans held off the Huskies 24–14 to win the game.

Colorado

USC beat Colorado, 42–17, in 2011 with Matt Barkley setting a school record with six touchdown passes. Both Matt Barkley and Robert Woods had record setting days as the Trojans cruised to a 50–6 victory.

Arizona

USC won the teams' last meeting in 2011, 48–41.

Oregon

In 2011, USC defeated the Oregon Ducks, 38–35.

1st quarter scoring: ORE – De'Anthony Thomas 16-yard pass from Marcus Mariota (Rob Beard Kick); USC – Andre Heidari 39-yard Field Goal; ORE – Josh Huff 21-yard pass from Mariota (Beard Kick)

2nd quarter scoring: ORE – Kenjon Barner 27-yard run (Beard kick); USC – Marqise Lee 75-yard pass from Matt Barkley (Heidari kick); ORE – Kenjon Barner 5-yard run (PAT blocked); USC – Robert Woods 7-yard pass from Barkley (Heidari kick); ORE – Daryle Hawkins 14-yard pass from Mariota (Beard kick); USC – Nelson Agholor 76-yard pass from Barkley (Heidari kick)

3rd quarter scoring: USC – Silas Redd 2-yard run (Heidari kick); ORE – Kenjon Barner 9-yard run (Beard kick); USC – Silas Redd 3-yard run (Heidari kick); ORE – Josh Huff 36-yard pass from Mariota (Beard kick)

4th quarter scoring: ORE – Kenjon Barner 5-yard run (Beard kick); USC – Randall Telfer 3-yard pass from Barkley (Heidari kick); ORE – Kenjon Barner 22-yard run (Beard kick); USC – Lee 3-yard pass from Barkley (Two-point conversion failed)

Arizona State

USC seeks to avenge a loss to the Arizona State Sun Devils in 2011.

UCLA

The matchup was the first time since 2005 that UCLA and USC met as ranked teams.  It was also the first time since 2001 that the Bruins entered the game ranked higher than the Trojans.

1st quarter scoring: UCLA – Brett Hundley 1-yard run (Ka'i  Fairbairn kick); UCLA – Fairbairn 23-yard field goal; UCLA – Joseph Fauria 17-yard pass from Hundley (Fairbairn kick).

2nd quarter scoring: UCLA – Johnathan Franklin 16-yard run (Fairbairn kick); USC – Nelson Agholor 33-yard pass from Matt Barkley (Andre Heidari kick); USC – Randall Telfer 2-yard pass from Barkley (Heidari kick).

3rd quarter scoring: USC – George Uko 0-yard fumble recovery (Heidari kick failed); UCLA – Hundley 3-yard run (Fairbairn kick).

4th quarter scoring: USC – Marqise Lee 14-yard pass from Barkley (Robert Woods pass from Barkley); UCLA – Franklin 29-yard run (Fairbairn kick).

Notre Dame

In 2011, USC defeated the Notre Dame Fighting Irish, 31–17.  USC has won nine of the last ten meetings against Notre Dame. ESPN's "College GameDay" show was at the game.

Georgia Tech (Sun Bowl)

Reports surfaced weeks after the game of a postgame altercation in the locker room which may have started over the younger players criticizing Matt Barkley for not playing in the game and his leadership in general, which led to several upperclassmen, including T.J. McDonald, coming to his defense. It was another incident that marked the close of a disappointing season for USC.

Rankings

Statistics

Scores by quarter (Pac-12 opponents)

References

USC
USC Trojans football seasons
USC Trojans football